The Renault FR1 was a single-decker coach produced by the bus division of Renault Trucks in France from 1987 to 1997.

Models were designated TE, TX and GTX and it is optional to have 1 door or 2 doors.

The model was facelifted in 1997 and renamed Renault Iliade to replace the normal FR1.

See also 

 List of buses

FR1
Vehicles introduced in 1987
Buses of France
Coaches (bus)
Single-deck buses
Full-size buses